The Cumulus Hills are several groups of largely barren hills in Antarctica.  Divided by the Logie Glacier, they are bounded by Shackleton Glacier on the west, McGregor Glacier on the north and Zaneveld Glacier on the south. The exposed rock in this area was observed on a number of occasions to give rise to the formation of cumulus clouds, considered to be very rare at this elevation. The hills were named by the Southern Party of the New Zealand Geological Survey Antarctic Expedition (1961–62) because of these clouds.

References
 

Hills of the Ross Dependency
Dufek Coast